Goldsboro, originally Goldsborough, is a city and the county seat of Wayne County, North Carolina, United States. The population was 33,657 at the 2020 census. It is the principal city of and is included in the Goldsboro, North Carolina Metropolitan Statistical Area. The nearby town of Waynesboro was founded in 1787, and Goldsboro was incorporated in 1847. It is the county seat of Wayne County.

Seymour Johnson Air Force Base is located in Goldsboro.

History
Around 1787, when Wayne County was formed, a town named Waynesborough grew around the county's courthouse. In 1787, William Whitfield III (son of William Whitfield II) and his son were appointed "Directors and Trustees"
for designing and building the town. Located on the east bank of the Neuse River, the town became the county seat. Population growth in Waynesborough continued through the 1830s. However, this changed once the Wilmington and Weldon Railroad was completed in the early 1840s. By then, a hotel had been built at the intersection of the railroad and New Bern Road, which grew into a community after the train started to transport passengers from there.

More and more citizens soon relocated from Waynesborough to this growing village, named eventually "Goldsborough's Junction" after Major Matthew T. Goldsborough, an Assistant Chief Engineer with the railroad line. Later this was shortened simply to Goldsborough. In 1847, the town was incorporated and became the new Wayne County seat following a vote of the citizens of Wayne County. Local legend has it the Goldsborough supporters put moonshine in the town's well to encourage people to vote for Goldsborough.

In the following decades, Goldsborough's growth continued in part by new railroad connections to Charlotte and Beaufort. By 1861, the town's population was estimated to be 1,500. It was the trading center of a rural area that started with yeoman farmers. By this time, it had been developed as large cotton plantations dependent on the labor of enslaved African Americans, as the invention of the cotton gin had enabled profitable cultivation of short-staple cotton in the up-counties.

Because of its importance as railroad junction, Goldsborough played a significant role in the Civil War, both for stationing Confederate troops and for transporting their supplies. The town also provided hospitals for soldiers wounded in nearby battles.

In December 1862, the Battle of Goldsborough Bridge was waged, in which both sides fought for possession of the strategically significant Wilmington and Weldon Railroad Bridge. Union General John Foster arrived with his troops on December 17, aiming to destroy this bridge in order to put an end to the vital supply chain from the port of Wilmington. He succeeded on that same day, his troops overpowering the small number of defending Confederate soldiers and burning down the bridge. On their way back to New Bern, Foster's men were attacked again by Confederate troops, but they survived with fewer casualties than the enemy. The important bridge at Goldsborough was rebuilt in a matter of weeks.

Goldsborough was the scene of another Union offensive in 1865, during Union General Sherman's Carolinas Campaign. After the battles of Bentonville and Wyse Fork, Sherman's forces met with the armies of Schofield, their troops taking over the city in March. During the following three weeks, Goldsborough was occupied by over 100,000 Union soldiers. After the war was over, some of these troops continued to stay in the city.

In 1869, the spelling of the city was officially changed to Goldsboro. Wayne County was part of North Carolina's 2nd congressional district following the Civil War, when it was known as the "Black Second", for its majority-black population. This district elected four Republican African Americans to Congress in the 19th century, three of them after the Reconstruction era. The attorney George Henry White was the last to serve, being elected in 1894 and serving two terms.

The Democrat-dominated legislature established legal racial segregation in public facilities. To further this, in the 1880s it authorized a facility to serve the black mentally ill, the State Hospital in Goldsboro. In 1899 the legislature authorized an addition but did not appropriate sufficient funds. This operated until after passage of civil rights legislation requiring integration of public facilities. In addition, the hospital was affected by the 1970s movement to de-institutionalize care for the mentally ill. Most states have failed to adequately support community programs to replace such facilities.

During World War II the North Carolina Congressional delegation was successful in gaining the present-day Seymour Johnson Air Force Base, which opened on the outskirts of Goldsboro in April 1942 as a US Army Air Forces installation named Seymour Johnson Field. From this point on, the city's population and businesses increased as a result of the federal defense installation. The base's name was changed to Seymour Johnson AFB in 1947 following the establishment of the US Air Force as an independent service.

The city is home to Goldsboro Milling Company, the 10th largest producer of hogs in the U.S., and also a major producer of turkeys.
 
The Borden Manufacturing Company, First Presbyterian Church, L. D. Giddens and Son Jewelry Store, Goldsboro Union Station, Harry Fitzhugh Lee House, Odd Fellows Lodge, and Solomon and Henry Weil Houses are listed on the National Register of Historic Places.

Nuclear accident

The two Mark 39 weapons were released after the crew abandoned a B-52 bomber which had suffered mid-flight structural failure. Both bombs went through several steps in the arming sequence, but neither detonated. One bomb was recovered. Although much of the second bomb was also recovered, a missing piece containing uranium was believed to have sunk deep into the swampy earth and could not be recovered. The piece remains in land that the Air Force eventually purchased in order to prevent any land use or digging. In 2013, it was revealed that three safety mechanisms on one bomb had failed, leaving just one low-voltage switch preventing detonation.

Geography

The Neuse River defines the southern boundary of the city.
Little River is a class WS-III river that provides the water source for Goldsboro.
Stoney Creek runs through the east of the city between downtown and the Seymour Johnson Air Force Base.
As of 1982 the Goldsboro waste-water treatment plant accounted for 59% of total effluent discharged into the Neuse between Clayton and Kinston.

The closest lakes to the city center are McArthur Lake,  to the southwest, Cedar Lake,  to the north and Quaker Neck Lake,  to the west.
Quaker Neck Lake is an artificial lake that supplies cooling water to the H.F. Lee Energy Complex. 
The closest reservoirs are Cogdells Pond,  to the northeast and Wills Pond,  to the west.
Wills Pond is also known as Bear Creek W/S Lake Number Four.
Wills Pond impounds Old Mill Branch, a tributary of Bear Creek that flows east and enters Bear Creek near its headwaters.

Climate
Goldsboro's location on the Atlantic Coastal Plain lends it a Humid subtropical climate, with hot humid summers and cool winters. The hottest month is July, with an average high temperature of 91 °F (31 °C), and an average low of 71 °F (22 °C). The coldest month is January, with an average high of 54 °F (11 °C), and an average low of 34 °F (0 °C). Annual total rainfall is 52.53 inches (1,334 mm), falling relatively evenly with a slight wet season in the late summer/early fall. Some light to moderate snowfall can take place in winter, but amounts can fluctuate greatly and can range from no snow to totals over one foot (30 cm) in some years.

Demographics

2020 census

As of the 2020 United States census, there were 33,657 people, 14,404 households, and 8,320 families residing in the city.

2019
As of 2019 census estimates, there were 34,186 people and 14,339 households residing in the city. The population density was 1,214.9 inhabitants per square mile (469.0/km). The racial makeup of the city was 52.7% African American, 39.9% White, 0.3% Native American, 2.2% Asian, 0.1% Pacific Islander, and 4.4% from two or more races. Hispanic or Latino of any race were 5.8% of the population.

The median income for a household in the city was $33,043, and the median income for a family was $59,844. Males had a median income of $55,223 versus $56,850 for females. The per capita income for the city was $21,666. About 26.2% of the population were below the poverty line.

Arts and culture

Sites of interest
 Cliffs of the Neuse State Park is a state park located near the city. It covers  along the southern banks of the Neuse River. It has a swimming area, several hiking trails, fishing areas, a nature museum, and picnic areas. The cliffs rise 90 feet above the Neuse River.
 Waynesborough Historical Village is a reconstructed "village" located near the original site of the town of Waynesborough. It is home to historical Wayne County buildings ranging from various periods of time. These buildings include a family home, a medical office, a one-room school, a law office, and a Quaker Meeting House.
 Herman Park includes a recreational center, miniature train, tennis courts, picnic shelters, a turn-of-the-century park house, gazebo, goldfish pond, fountain, and children's playground.
 The Oheb Shalom synagogue's Romanesque Revival building is one of fewer than a hundred nineteenth-century synagogues still standing in the United States, and the second oldest synagogue building in the state.

Government

Chuck Allen served as the city's Mayor, succeeding Alfonzo "Al" King in 2016 who succeeded Hal Plonk in 2002. As mayor, Allen was the official and ceremonial head of city government and presides at all City Council meetings. The mayor and the city council are elected to office for a four-year term. Goldsboro has a council-manager government. As of 2020, the city manager is Tim Salmon. 

In June 2021, Allen abruptly resigned citing health issues.

City council
 1st District: Hiawatha Jones
 2nd District: Bill Broadway
 3rd District: Taj Polak
 4th District: Brandi Matthews 
 5th District: David Ham
 6th District: Gene Aycock

Federal representatives
Goldsboro has been in North Carolina's 7th congressional district since January 3, 2017, and is currently represented by Republican David Rouzer. Beginning on January 3, 2021, Goldsboro will be in North Carolina's 1st congressional district and will be represented by Democrat G. K. Butterfield.

Goldsboro is represented in the Senate by Republicans Richard Burr and Thom Tillis.

Education

Colleges
 North Carolina Wesleyan College Goldsboro campus
 Wayne Community College

High schools
 Eastern Wayne High School
 Goldsboro High School
 Rosewood High School
 Wayne Early/Middle College High School
 Wayne School of Engineering
 Charles B. Aycock High School
 Spring Creek High School
 Southern Wayne High School

Middle schools
Dillard Middle School
Eastern Wayne Middle School
Greenwood Middle School
Rosewood Middle School

Elementary schools
Carver Heights Elementary School
Dillard Academy Charter School
Eastern Wayne Elementary School
Grantham Elementary School
Meadow Lane Elementary School
North Drive Elementary School
Rosewood Elementary School
School Street Early Learning Center
Spring Creek Elementary School
Tommy's Road Elementary School

Private schools
Faith Christian Academy
Pathway Christian Academy
St. Mary Catholic School
Wayne Christian School
Wayne Country Day School
Wayne Preparatory Academy

Media

Newspaper
The Goldsboro News-Argus is a paid subscription to Goldsboro's daily newspaper with a circulation of approximately 16,500.

Goldsboro Daily News is a free online daily newspaper.

Television
Goldsboro supports one television station. WHFL TV 43 is a low-power broadcast station on UHF channel 43 and is also found on two local cable networks. The station is a FamilyNet affiliate and carries religious, local, and family programming. The area is also served by television stations from the Raleigh-Durham and Greenville areas. CBS affiliate WNCN-TV, Channel 17, is licensed to Goldsboro but has its studios in Raleigh. Up until August 2010, a Public, educational, and government access (PEG) cable TV station called PACC-10 TV was available to Time Warner Cable customers. The station aired its own programming as well as City Council and County Commissioner meetings. Time Warner Cable transferred the channel to Wayne County which currently provides local announcements and community interest programming.

Radio stations based in Goldsboro
 WZKT 97.7 FM Country
 WFMC 730 AM Black Gospel
 WGBR 1150 AM News/Talk
 WSSG 1300 AM/92.7 FM JAMZ Urban

Infrastructure

Transportation
The closest civilian airport is Wayne Executive Jetport, but is only used for general aviation. The nearest public commercial airport is Pitt-Greenville Airport  in Greenville about 36 miles northeast of Goldsboro. However, most residents use Raleigh-Durham International Airport for domestic and international travel.

Major highways that run through the city are US 70 (the main thoroughfare through Goldsboro), US 13, US 117, NC 111, and NC 581. I-795 now connects Goldsboro to I-95 in Wilson.

The Goldsboro Bypass which is a route of U.S. 70 was fully opened in May 2016. Previously NC 44 while partially open and under construction, it became US 70 Bypass upon completion and has been designated as Future Interstate 42.

The city has a bus system known as Gateway which runs four routes.

Until the 1960s, the Southern Railway and the Seaboard Coast Line ran passenger trains in and out of Goldsboro Union Station to points west, north and south.

Hospitals
 Wayne Memorial Hospital (North Carolina), a medical facility located in Goldsboro, is the county's second-largest employer.
 Cherry Hospital is a psychiatric hospital which first started in 1880 as a facility to treat mentally ill African Americans. A museum depicting its history is also part of the hospital campus.
O'Berry Neuro-Medical Center is a North Carolina Department of Health and Human Services hospital providing rehabilitative services to people with intellectual disabilities/ developmental disabilities.

Notable people

 George Altman, baseball player for Chicago Cubs
Dan Bullock, United States Marine, Private First Class, Vietnam War 
 Christopher R. Barron, member of board of directors and co-founder of GOProud
 Curtis Hooks Brogden, 19th-Century politician
 Jimmy Graham, tight end for New Orleans Saints and Seattle Seahawks
 Johnny Grant, radio personality, television producer and honorary mayor of Hollywood
 Andy Griffith, actor, lived in Goldsboro, teaching English, drama, and music at Goldsboro High School
 John W. Gulick, U.S. Army major general
 Doris Jackson, née Doris Coley, founding member of the Shirelles
 John H. Kerr, III, state senator
 Clyde King, baseball pitcher and manager of Atlanta Braves and New York Yankees
 Jerry Narron, baseball player and manager of Texas Rangers and Cincinnati Reds
 Mark O'Meara, golfer who won 1998 Masters and British Open
 Jarran Reed, NFL defensive tackle
 Kenneth Claiborne Royall, Army general and last Secretary of War
 Dave Simmons, football player for four NFL teams
 David Thornton, football player for Tennessee Titans and Indianapolis Colts
 Big Daddy V, former WWE wrestler. His real name was Nelson Frazier Jr
 Joby Warrick, winner of two Pulitzer Prizes
 Greg Warren, long snapper for Pittsburgh Steelers
 Thomas Washington, an admiral during World War I
 William Henry Washington, 19th-Century politician
 Coby White, NBA basketball player for Chicago Bulls

References

External links

 Government
 
 General information